Maria Dermoût (15 June 1888 – 27 June 1962) was an Indo-European novelist, considered one of the greats of Dutch literature and as such an important proponent of Dutch Indies literature. In December 1958 Time magazine praised the translation of Maria Dermoût's The Ten Thousand Things, and named it one of the best books of the year.

Whitney Balliett of The New Yorker wrote: "Mrs. Dermout, in the manner of Thoreau and the early Hemingway, is an extraordinary sensualist. [...] in passages of a startling, unadorned, three-dimensional clarity; often one can almost touch what she describes."

Biography
Dermoût was a Dutch novelist born on a sugar plantation in Pati, Java, Dutch East Indies, and educated in the Netherlands, who wrote in Dutch. After completing her education she returned to Java, where she married and travelled extensively across Java and the Moluccas with her husband. In 1933 her husband was pensioned, and the couple returned to the Netherlands. Maria Dermoût was widowed in 1952.

Dermoût died in The Hague in 1962. She is the subject of the biography Geheim Indië. Het leven van Maria Dermoût 1888-1962 ("The Secret East Indies. The Life of Maria Dermoût 1888-1962") in 2000 by the Indo-European (Dutch-Indonesian) author Kester Freriks.

Body of work
Dermoût turned to writing early in life, but remained largely unpublished until she was 63. She wrote two novels, both of which were not published until she was in her sixties: The Ten Thousand Things (De tienduizend dingen, 1955) and Days Before Yesterday — also published as Just Yesterday (Nog pas gisteren, 1951). There are English translations of her novels by Hans Koning. Some of her short stories were published in translation in magazines such as Vogue during the 1960s. In Dutch, five short-story collections by her were also published.

She is viewed as one of the giants among Dutch-Indies literary writers, and The Ten Thousand Things in particular is widely regarded as an idiosyncratic masterpiece. The book has been translated into thirteen languages. As Hans Koning puts it in his Introduction to the New York Review Books edition of the novel:

"Dermoût was sui generis, a case all her own. She did not write about her Indies as a Dutch woman, or as a Javanese or an Ambonese. Hers was a near-compassionate disdain for the dividing lines, the hatreds and the fears ... She painted landscapes, still lifes and people in a world of myth and mystery."

Although not conventionally autobiographical, both of her novels draw from Dermoût's own life. In particular, like the central character in The Ten Thousand Things, Dermoût lost her son in violent circumstances (he died in a Japanese prisoner-of-war camp). The Javanese childhood experiences and reminiscences described in Days Before Yesterday are based on, but do not mirror, her own childhood in the tropics.

Author Oek de Jong appropriately wrote:

"Still, Maria Dermoût an author for the happy few. Is she a writer's writer? Certainly not. She is a storyteller par excellence. Her stories are subtle, but they are also accessible. Nonetheless she remains an author for the happy few, equal to the greats of Dutch prose, but much less known than they are. There are many reasons for her modest literary reputation: her own modesty, the small body of her work, the brevity of her literary career. But it is mainly her work itself that is the cause. It possesses something that wards off hordes of readers, yet still manages to attract a handful, who then embrace it and spread the word of its exquisite nature. The shell seekers among the readers, the slow walkers, those who stop and turn and bend over to pick up that one beautiful shell - they recognize her extraordinary work."

References

External links
Maria Dermout website.

1880s births
1962 deaths
20th-century Dutch East Indies people
People from Pekalongan
Indonesian women novelists
Novelists from the Dutch East Indies
Indonesian people of Dutch descent
Indo people
20th-century Dutch novelists
20th-century Dutch women writers
Dutch women novelists
20th-century Indonesian women writers